Gabriela Vaquer (born 7 May 1990) is a Puerto Rican footballer who plays as a midfielder. She has been a member of the Puerto Rico women's national team.

Early life
Vaquer was raised in San Juan.

References

1990 births
Living people
Women's association football midfielders
Puerto Rican women's footballers
Sportspeople from San Juan, Puerto Rico
Puerto Rico women's international footballers
Competitors at the 2010 Central American and Caribbean Games
Women's Premier Soccer League players